The 2021–22 Appalachian State Mountaineers men's basketball team represented Appalachian State University in the 2021–22 NCAA Division I men's basketball season. The Mountaineers, led by third-year head coach Dustin Kerns, played their home games at the Holmes Center in Boone, North Carolina as members in the Sun Belt Conference. They finished the season 19–15, 12–6 in Sun Belt play to finish in second place. They defeated Georgia Southern in the quarterfinals of the Sun Belt tournament before losing to Georgia State in the semifinals. The Mountaineers received an invitation to The Basketball Classic postseason tournament, formerly known as the CollegeInsider.com Tournament. There they lost in the first round to USC Upstate.

Previous season
In a season limited due to the ongoing COVID-19 pandemic, the Mountaineers finished the 2020–21 season 17–12, 7–8 in Sun Belt play to finish in fourth place in the West Division. In the Sun Belt tournament, they defeated Little Rock in the first round, Texas State in the quarterfinals, and Coastal Carolina in the semifinals to advance to the championship game. In the championship game, they defeated Georgia State, sending the Mountaineers to their third ever NCAA tournament appearance, and their first since 2000. In the NCAA tournament, they received the #16 seed in the West Region, matching up with fellow #16 seed Norfolk State in the First Four, narrowly losing the game by a point, 53–54.

Roster

Schedule and results

|-
!colspan=12 style=| Non-conference regular season

|-
!colspan=9 style=| Sun Belt Conference regular season

|-
!colspan=12 style=| Sun Belt tournament

|-
!colspan=12 style=| The Basketball Classic
|-

Source

References

Appalachian State Mountaineers men's basketball seasons
Appalachian State Mountaineers
Appalachian State Mountaineers men's basketball
Appalachian State Mountaineers men's basketball
Appalachian State Mountaineers